Judge Tenney

Asa Wentworth Tenney (1833–1897), judge of the United States District Court for the Eastern District of New York
Charles Henry Tenney (1911–1994), judge of the United States District Court for the Southern District of New York